is one of Japan's largest food manufacturers and brands. It began in 1913 in Osaka as Urakami Shoten and began selling curry in 1926.

House Foods is the world's largest manufacturer of Japanese curry, and is well known for its Japanese curry brands, Vermont Curry and Java Curry.  It is also a major manufacturer of spices such as wasabi, shichimi, yuzukoshō, and black pepper. In addition, House Foods manufactures mixes and roux for various yōshoku including cream stew, beef stew, chowder, Hayashi rice, mabo tofu, sundōbu-chige, Bolognese sauce, oden broth, fried rice, Hamburg, and gratin; instant ramen such as Umakacchan; snacks such as Tongari Corn and potato chips; desserts such as Fruiche, pudding, sherbet, and jelly; and drinks such as oolong tea, mugicha, and lassi. It also owns Ichibanya, a Japanese curry restaurant with over 1,400 outlets around the world, and operates the Hungry Bear Restaurant at Tokyo Disneyland and the Casbah Food Court at Tokyo DisneySea. House Foods also engages in food technology, notably developing the tear-free onion Smile Ball (Goldies in the US), created by removing the tear-producing lachrymatory agent syn-propanethial-S-oxide, which won its creators the 2013 Ig Nobel Prize in Chemistry.

House Foods is also well-known for collaborating with renowned entertainers such as Arashi, Hey! Say! JUMP, AKB48, Nogizaka46, Takuya Kimura and Masahiro Nakai of SMAP, Tsubasa Honda, Hikaru Nishida, Rurouni Kenshin: The Final Actress Emi Takei, former leader of Morning Musume Miki Fujimoto, and Gen Hoshino. As a sponsor of TV programs, House Foods is known for the World Masterpiece Theater on Fuji TV.

Subsidiaries
Its subsidiary House Foods America Corporation is the largest provider of tofu products in the United States.

House Foods America Corp. has tofu plants in California and New Jersey with a combined capacity of manufacturing 350,000 pieces of tofu per day. Its largest competitor in the U.S. tofu market is Vitasoy, followed by Morinaga Milk Industry.

House Foods America Corp. formerly operated the Japanese curry restaurant chain Curry House. It had nine locations across California. Its first opened at Weller Court Shopping Center in Little Tokyo, Los Angeles in 1983. House Foods sold Curry House in 2019. Its new owners closed the chain permanently on Monday, February 24 of 2020.

In 2016, House Foods acquired Ichibanya which operates Japan's largest curry restaurant chain, Curry House CoCo ICHIBANYA, with over 1400 outlets across the United States, Thailand, Indonesia, Singapore, China, Taiwan, Malaysia, Hong Kong, South Korea, Vietnam, the United Kingdom, the Philippines, and Japan and soon India. It also operates a spaghetti chain Pasta de Coco.

In addition, House Foods produces high-end and commercial spices through its subsidiaries Gaban and Asaoka Spice, vitamin drinks such as C1000 (飲料), popular anti-hangover drink Ukon no chikara, and health products such as Immuno-LP20 under its subsidiary House Wellness Foods, cellophane noodles or vermicelli through its subsidiary Malony, meat substitute food products and salsa through its subsidiary El Burrito Mexican Food Products Corporation, MRE convenience store food products in Japan such as bread, spaghetti, salad, cream puff, crème brûlée, and bento through its subsidiary Delica Chef, vitamin drinks in Thailand through its subsidiary House Osotspa Foods, and engages in the import and export of food products and agricultural commodities through Vox Trading.

References

External links

 House Foods
 House Foods Group Inc
 Ichibanya
 House Foods Group Inc
 House Foods America website
 CoCo Ichibanya
 Immuno-LP20

Food and drink companies of Japan
Condiment companies
Companies listed on the Tokyo Stock Exchange
Companies based in Osaka Prefecture
Japanese companies established in 1913
Food and drink companies established in 1913
Japanese brands
Soy product brands
Midori-kai
Confectionery companies of Japan